Realty ONE Group is a Laguna Niguel, California-based real-estate brokerage and franchising company. As of 2022, it employed over 18,500 real estate professionals in over 400 offices across the United States and Canada.

History 
The group was founded in Las Vegas in 2005 by Kuba Jewgieniew, a former stockbroker.  In 2007, the company expanded into Arizona. By August 2010, it had also expanded into California, and had 2,200 agents. 

In August 2011 the brokerage acquired John Hall & Associates, a Phoenix, Arizona-based real estate brokerage.

In May 2012, the company acquired Southern California-based brokerage eVantage Home Realty. In August, it opened an affiliate program in order to franchise locations.

In June 2020, the company introduced a luxury brand to promote high end properties worth over $1 million.

References

External links
 Official Website

Real estate companies of the United States
Franchises